No contest may refer to:

Nolo contendere, a plea in a criminal court case (also known as no contest)
No contest (combat sports), a decision at a sporting event (especially boxing)
No Contest (film) a film starring Shannon Tweed